For the Summer Olympics, there are 79 venues starting with the letter 'S'. This is the most among all venues alphabetically.

References

 List S